Josiah Yazdani (born November 29, 1991) is a former gridiron football placekicker. He was a member of the Cleveland Gladiators of the Arena Football League (AFL).

College career
Yazdani committed to Ohio University and played four years for the Ohio Bobcats football team. He graduated in 2015 ranked second all-time in field goals made at Ohio, with 47.

Professional career
On April 28, 2017, Yazdani signed with the Cleveland Gladiators of the Arena Football League for the 2017 Arena Football League season.

References

External links
 
arenafan.com profile
Ohio Bobcats bio

1991 births
Living people
People from Albany, Ohio
Players of American football from Ohio
American football placekickers
Ohio Bobcats football players
Cleveland Gladiators players